This is a list of rugby league footballers who have played first grade for the St. George Dragons. Players are listed in the order they made their debut.

Players

References

External links
Rugby League Tables / St. George Dragons Point Scorers
RLP List of Players

Lists of Australian rugby league players
National Rugby League lists
Sydney-sport-related lists